Adarsh Vidyalaya Higher Secondary School is a Matriculation School by the Punjab Association for girls. It is in Royapettah, Chennai, India.

The school was founded by Padmashri. P.N. Dhawan, Mrs. Visharda Hoon was the first principal. Mrs Vasanthalakshmi and Mrs Radha Ravangi were subsequent principals.

Its other branches are Adarsh Vidyalaya Branch School, Adarsh Higher Secondary School, Maloney Road (Closed in 2007), Gill Adarsh Matriculation Higher Secondary School, MGR Adarsh Public Matric Higher Secondary School, Padma Adarsh Higher Secondary School and Anna Adarsh Matric Higher Secondary School.

Notable alumni
Parvathy (lyricist)
C.S. Suresh Kumar (ex-Cricketer/Coach)

Sources
moderneducation.com

High schools and secondary schools in Chennai